The 1864 Louisiana gubernatorial (Union) election was the first election to take place under the Louisiana Constitution of 1864. As a result of this election Michael Hahn became Governor of Union-controlled Louisiana.

Results
Popular Vote

References

1864 in Louisiana
1864
Gubernatorial
Louisiana (Union)
February 1864 events